Wayne Carney is an Anglican priest: he has been Archdeacon of Killaloe, Kilfenora, Clonfert and Kilmacduagh since 2002.

Carney was born in 1952; educated at the University of Toronto and the Church of Ireland Theological College; and ordained in 1985. He was a curate in Scarborough, Toronto and then the incumbent at Roche's Point, Newmarket, Ontario, Clonfert and Birr.

References

1952 births
Living people
Archdeacons of Killaloe, Kilfenora, Clonfert and Kilmacduagh
Alumni of the University of Liverpool
Alumni of the Church of Ireland Theological Institute